Martin Masella (born 4 November 1969) is a Tongan former professional rugby league footballer who played in the 1990s and 2000s. He was a Tonga international and played at the 1995 Rugby League World Cup. Masella captained Tonga in the 2000 Rugby League World Cup.

Background
Masella was born to factory workers.

Playing career
Masella played in Australia for Balmain Tigers, Illawarra Steelers and South Sydney before moving to England to play in the Super League for the Leeds Rhinos. He was later awarded Leeds Rhinos heritage player number 1291. After leaving the Rhinos, Masella played for Wakefield Trinity Wildcats and Warrington Wolves.

In September 2000, at the height of a financial crisis at the Wakefield Trinity Wildcats, the contracts of all players aged over 24 were terminated. The players affected were; Andy Fisher, Bobbie Goulding, Warren Jowitt, Tony Kemp (player-coach), Steve McNamara, Francis Maloney, Martin Masella, Steve Prescott, Bright Sodje, Francis Stephenson and Glen Tomlinson. Masella was one of a group of players who were awarded compensation from an industrial tribunal as a result of the dismissal.

Masella came out of retirement to play for Tonga against Cumbria at the age of 36.

References

External links
(archived by web.archive.org) World Cup 1995 details
(archived by web.archive.org) Profile at leedsrugby

1969 births
Living people
Balmain Tigers players
Illawarra Steelers players
Leeds Rhinos players
People from ʻEua
Rugby league locks
Rugby league props
Rugby league second-rows
South Sydney Rabbitohs players
Tonga national rugby league team captains
Tonga national rugby league team players
Tongan rugby league players
Wakefield Trinity players
Warrington Wolves players